This is a chronological summary of the major events of the 2020 Summer Paralympics in Tokyo, Japan, which was postponed to 2021 due to the COVID-19 pandemic. The opening ceremony is scheduled on 24 August with the last day of competition and the closing ceremony on 5 September.

Calendar

Medal table

Day-by-day summaries

Day 0 — Tuesday 24 August

 Opening ceremony
 The opening ceremony was held at Japan National Stadium at 20:00 JST (UTC+9).

Day 1 — Wednesday 25 August

Day 2 — Thursday 26 August

Day 3 — Friday 27 August

Day 4 — Saturday 28 August

References

External links 
Tokyo 2020 

2020 Summer Paralympics
2020